Ewen Cameron (born 23 May 1972) is a Scottish comedian, television presenter and radio DJ. He currently presents on Bauer Media's Greatest Hits Radio Scotland Network and hosts The Big Scottish Football Podcast alongside Steven Mill.

Cameron hosted the late-night television programme The Late Show with Ewen Cameron on STV2 from 2016–2018. He was also host of STV2 lifestyle show Live at Five, from 2016 until 2018, as well as hosting a variety of STV television specials, including, The Festival Show and Scotland's Big Sleep Out.

Early life
Cameron grew up in Edinburgh and attended Tynecastle High School. He has two brothers; their parents split when they were young. He also had a half-brother, Craig, who died after taking his own life in April 2014, aged 31.

Cameron has suffered from panic attacks since he was 13.

Career

Early career
Cameron began his career working as a sports journalist in Dubai, United Arab Emirates. After filling in for his friend DJing in a nightclub there, he decided to quit journalism and do nightclub DJing full time.

Radio career
Having worked as a nightclub DJ in Dubai for a while, Cameron was offered a job at the city's radio station, Emirates Radio. Six months after joining, he was presenting the breakfast show and later switched to the drivetime slot before ultimately becoming station manager. On 11 September 2001, having mentioning in a UK newspaper feature that he would like to come back to live in Scotland, Cameron had an interview for Real Radio in Glasgow, which he joined later that month as the station's sports editor. In 2002, he and Alan Rough became co-hosts of The Real Radio Football Phone In, which they presented together for eight years. In December 2010, Cameron was announced as the new host of the Real Radio breakfast show, taking over from former Scot FM DJ Robin Galloway. "This is a fantastic opportunity to host the Breakfast Show on Scotland's No.1 commercial radio station and one that I'm honoured to take," Cameron said. "I have thoroughly enjoyed my time on the Football Phone In, but now I will get the chance to actually go and watch the football, instead of just talk about it!"

January 2011 marked the beginning of a long working relationship between Cameron and Cat Harvey. They continued in the breakfast slot when the station rebranded as Heart FM Breakfast in May 2014. Cameron left the station to pursue other opportunities and was replaced by Robin Galloway when the normal weekday scheduled resumed on 5 January 2015, after the weekday schedule changed during the Christmas season.

On 9 August 2015, Cameron and Harvey became hosts of the Sunday breakfast show on the Greatest Hits Radio Scotland Network as part of the Bauer Media Group, including Clyde 2, Forth 2, MFR2, Northsound 2, Tay 2 and West Sound. Cameron began presenting solo at breakfast Monday to Friday from 10 September 2018. In December 2020, it was announced Harvey would reunite with Cameron for Ewen & Cat at Breakfast on weekdays. In October 2021, the duo stepped down from the Sunday breakfast slot, with Greig "Greigsy" Easton taking over.

Cameron can also be heard on The Big Saturday Football Show, which is broadcast on Forth 1 every Saturday afternoon, alongside Steven Mill. Launched on 17 October 2020 to rival Superscoreboard on Clyde 1, the show features a mix of music, sport and entertainment. In July 2022, Cameron and Mill began hosting The Big Scottish Football Podcast.

Television career

Cameron began his television career with STV in 2015 when he began co-presenting The Fountainbridge Show in 2015 in which he stepped down from in 2016 in order to begin co-presenting Live at Five on the then recently launched STV2 channel. The same year in 2016, Cameron was commissioned for his own late-night talk show on the STV2 channel. 

The show, The Late Show with Ewen Cameron began broadcasting in January 2016, originally on the STV Glasgow and STV Edinburgh networks, until both channels were axed in 2017 and merged to form the new STV2 channel, where the programme aired at 10:30 pm.

On 16 May 2018, it was announced that STV2 would close and all of its original programming including The Late Show with Ewen Cameron would be axed in June 2018. The final episode aired on 28 June ahead of the STV2 closure on 30 June.

Personal life
Cameron has been married to his Irish wife, Teresa, since 1994. They renewed their vows on 14 May 2012. The couple live in Falkirk and have three sons: Liam, Ryan and Josh.

Cameron is a Heart of Midlothian F.C. fan and has been a season ticket holder at Tynecastle Park "on and off" for several years.

Filmography

Television
 The Fountainbridge Show (2015–2016): Co-presenter
 Live at Five (2016–2018): Co-presenter
 The Late Show with Ewen Cameron (2016–2018): Host

Radio
 Ewen Cameron in the Morning (Greatest Hits Radio Scotland, 2018–2020)
 Ewen & Cat @ Breakfast (Greatest Hits Radio Scotland, 2021–present)

References

Living people
1972 births
Scottish comedians
Scottish radio presenters
Scottish television presenters
Television personalities from Edinburgh
British radio personalities